Max Happle (born 26 October 1914, date of death unknown) was a Swiss diver. He competed in the men's 3 metre springboard event at the 1936 Summer Olympics.

References

1914 births
Year of death missing
Swiss male divers
Olympic divers of Switzerland
Divers at the 1936 Summer Olympics
Place of birth missing